In Mandaeism, rishama (rišama) is a daily ablution ritual. Unlike the masbuta, it does not require the assistance of a priest. Rishama (signing) is performed before prayers and involves washing the face and limbs while reciting specific prayers such as the rushma. It is performed daily, before sunrise, with hair covered and after evacuation of bowels, or before religious ceremonies.

Tamasha (ṭamaša) is another type of ablution performed by Mandaeans in which the entire body is fully immersed three times in water.

Parallels
The ablution is comparable to wudu in Islam.

John D. Turner and other scholars have noted that in Sethianism, rituals reminiscent of Mandaean ablutions (i.e., the rishama and tamasha) are mentioned in Nag Hammadi texts such as the Trimorphic Protennoia, since they involve triple immersion in water, signing, and other similar features.

See also
Rushma
Ablution in Christianity
Ritual washing in Judaism
Wudu in Islam

References

External links
The Worlds of Mandaean Priests (University of Exeter)
Rishama (Ablution)
Brakha and Rishama instructional video 
Afternoon brakha and ablution in Amarah, Iraq

Mandaic words and phrases
Mandaean rituals
Ritual purification
Water and religion